Hiddenite, North Carolina, United States, is a centre for the mining of gemstones.  Three larger mines found there are Adams Mine, NAEM and the Emerald Hollow Mine. They are collectively known as the Hiddenite Gem Mines.

Discovery

The first discovery of the hiddenite stone was made in 1879 by W. E. Hidden. Samples were sent to Dr. J. Lawrence Smith in Louisville, Kentucky, who determined that the stone Hidden had collected was spodumene. The variety was given the name hiddenite.  Emeralds had earlier been found during ploughing in 1874.

Emerald Hollow Mine

One of the major mines in the county is the Emerald Hollow Mine. This a public gem mine located in the Piedmont of North Carolina in Alexander County, specifically in the town of Hiddenite.

At the mine, more than 63 different types of gems and minerals can be found including emeralds, amethyst, sapphire, aquamarine, topaz, garnet, as well as the stone Hiddenite, which is a stone only found in this local area. The ways in which gems can be uncovered in this mine are by sluicing, creeking, or digging.  Sluicing is the process of taking a small amount of dirt or soil removed from the mine and sifting through it with a stream of running water known as a sluiceway. As the dirt is washed down the trough, the larger pieces of gems, minerals, and other stones are left in the sifter.

Digging in permitted areas allows for visitors of the mine to dig into the earth to search for veins that may contain gemstones. 
The use of the creek is a major part of the mine. Guests are allowed to enter the mountain creek water to search for valuable stones.

The mine has an on-site lapidary shop where visitors’ gem stones can be cleaned, finished, and made into jewelry.

Rist Mine (North American Emerald Mine) 

Another major mine is the North American Emerald Mine (NAEM), operated privately.

For excavating the stones, large, modern, and professional equipment is used to unearth the gems hidden deep within the pits of the NAEM.

Emeralds found

The stone was named the Stephenson Emerald in honor of John A. D. Stephenson, a late 19th-century collector instrumental in the discovery of the first North Carolina emerald and the first world discovery of hiddenite.

In 2003, a larger emerald was uncovered at the NAEM by Jamie Hill.

In 2006, NAEM unearthed a yet larger emerald, said to be 10 inches in length.

Adams Mine

Also located in the hills of Hiddenite are the Adams mine, formerly known as the Warren mine, the Emerald & Hiddenite mine, the Turner mine, and the Hiddenite mine.

Other discoveries

At the time, this was largest emerald crystal ever found in North America. However, it was stolen from the American Museum of Natural History, NY, in 1950 and never recovered.

Some of these stones are now displayed in the Smithsonian.

A recent large discovery occurred in 1980 when over 1,500 hiddenite crystals were found in a large underground vein pocket.

References

Buildings and structures in Alexander County, North Carolina
Mines in North Carolina
Gemstone mines
Tourist attractions in Alexander County, North Carolina